Dan for Mayor is a Canadian television sitcom starring Fred Ewanuick that debuted on March 1, 2010 on CTV and The Comedy Network. It premiered the same night as Hiccups, a show created by Corner Gas star Brent Butt that also features fellow Corner Gas alumna Nancy Robertson. On June 7, 2010, both Dan for Mayor and Hiccups were renewed for a second season. The second season premiered on June 5, 2011. Neither show was renewed for a third season.

Premise 
The series stars Ewanuick as Dan Phillips, a slacker in his early 30s, who finds himself running for mayor of Wessex, a fictional city in Ontario, in the 2010 municipal elections, after a chance comment to his ex-girlfriend. When his opponent, incumbent mayor Bud, is hit by a bus and killed, Dan becomes the only mayoral candidate whereupon he reopens the candidacy for a fair race. In the show's second season, Dan takes office as the city's new mayor, finding himself woefully unprepared for the job.

The cast also included Mary Ashton, Paul Bates, Benjamin Ayres, Laurie Murdoch, David Ferry, Suzanne Coy, Agam Darshi, and Lara Jean Chorostecki.

The show also featured several cameo appearances by real-life mayors of Ontario cities, including Carl Zehr, Brenda Halloran, and David Miller.

Filming locations 
The series' location shooting took place in Kitchener, Waterloo, Ontario, and Hamilton, Ontario; recognizable locations include Kitchener City Hall (as Wessex City Hall) and the Huether Hotel (as Fern's Grill, Dan's workplace).

Episodes

Season 1 (2010)

Season 2 (2011)

Awards and nominations

References

External links

 Official website
 

2010 Canadian television series debuts
2011 Canadian television series endings
2010s Canadian workplace comedy television series
CTV Television Network original programming
CTV Comedy Channel original programming
Canadian political comedy television series
Television shows set in Ontario
Television shows filmed in Hamilton, Ontario
Television shows filmed in Kitchener, Ontario
Waterloo, Ontario
2010s Canadian sitcoms
Television series by Bell Media